Avon Heath Country Park is a Green Flag–awarded park located in St Leonards, Dorset, approx 10 miles north of Bournemouth.

The park is dominated by acres of lowland and wetland heath, grassland and heather, while pine and birch woodlands make up much of the rest of the scenery. The park contains internationally important wildlife, including rare species such as sand lizards, smooth snakes, Dartford warblers, woodlarks and the silver-studded blue butterfly.

Facilities including a discovery centre, a café that's open daily, picnic areas, a children's adventure playground, and barbecues to hire.

References

Country parks in Dorset